A Present from Margate is a 1933 British comedy play by Ian Hay and A.E.W. Mason.

It premiered at the Palace Theatre in Manchester, before transferring to the Shaftesbury Theatre in London's West End. The cast included Reginald Gardiner, Joyce Bland, Michael Shepley and Frank Pettingell. It was produced by Athole Stewart.

Film adaptation
In 1935 it was adapted by Hollywood studio Warner Brothers into a film The Widow from Monte Carlo starring Dolores del Río and Colin Clive.

References

Bibliography
 Goble, Alan. The Complete Index to Literary Sources in Film. Walter de Gruyter, 1999.
 Wearing, J.P. The London Stage 1930-1939: A Calendar of Productions, Performers, and Personnel.  Rowman & Littlefield, 2014.

1933 plays
Plays by Ian Hay
Plays by A. E. W. Mason
British plays adapted into films
Comedy plays
Plays set in London
West End plays